Mark McManus (21 February 1935 – 6 June 1994) was a Scottish actor. 

He has played roles in British television series Sam, Bulman, The Brothers, Strangers, and Dramarama and starred in the feature film 2000 Weeks. He was best known for playing the tough Glaswegian Detective Chief Inspector Jim Taggart in the long-running STV television series Taggart from 1983 until his death in 1994.

Career
McManus was born in Hamilton, Scotland, and moved to Hillingdon in London, England when he was three years old, until he moved again at the age of 16 to Australia, where he performed in amateur theatre groups that led him to becoming a professional actor. He appeared in the children's TV series Skippy the Bush Kangaroo and had a guest appearance in the long-running Australian police drama Homicide. He also starred in Tim Burstall's feature film 2000 Weeks (1969), which was the first full-length Australian-produced feature made in Australia since Charles Chauvel's Jedda in 1954.

McManus also appeared in the American-produced historical drama Adam's Woman and co-starred with Mick Jagger in the Tony Richardson film version of the Ned Kelly story, Ned Kelly (both 1970).

McManus returned to the UK in 1971, and was known to a wider audience when he played roles such as Harry Carter in The Brothers and Sam Wilson, a coal miner in the 1973 TV series Sam. McManus appeared opposite Peter O'Toole in the 1976 TV movie Rogue Male, and starred as a dour Scots police officer, Jack Lambie, in Strangers, a role he reprised as a guest star in the spin-off, Bulman. McManus also had roles in productions at the National Theatre and the Royal Court Theatre.

McManus was also a boxer before he moved into acting. He is not to be confused with the boxer of the same name (born 1974) from Basildon in England.

Some of the more notable shows in which he featured include:
 Sam (TV series), 1973–1975
 Taggart, 1983–1994
 Bulman, 1985–1987
 Dramarama, "The Macramé Man", 1988

Taggart 
McManus began playing the title character in the crime drama Taggart in September 1983, alongside Neil Duncan, Tom Watson and Robert Robertson. The pilot attracted an estimated 7.6 million viewers. When Duncan left the show in 1987, James MacPherson joined as new character Michael Jardine, immediately promoted to replace Duncan's character as detective sergeant. This was preceded by the arrival of a new superintendent, Jack McVitie, in the 1985 episode "Murder In Season". A new female detective constable, Jackie Reid (portrayed by Blythe Duff), was introduced in 1990 and, in "Rogue's Gallery" (1990), Taggart promoted her to detective sergeant.

Death
McManus drank heavily and, after several years of declining health, died from an alcohol-related illness. He was hospitalised with severe jaundice in May 1994, and died in Glasgow of pneumonia brought on by liver failure, on 6 June 1994, aged 59, eight months after the death of his second wife Marion. In the last two years of his life McManus had also lost his mother, his brother and his two sisters. The actor was the first person to be posthumously awarded the Lord Provost of Glasgow's Award for Performing Arts.

McManus's final Taggart episode was "Prayer for the Dead" (1995). He was the first Taggart cast member to die; he was followed by Iain Anders (Jack McVitie) who died three years later in 1997, aged 64, from a heart attack.

After the death of McManus in 1994, his character was given an on-air funeral in the final episode of the series's 11th season, "Black Orchid". In the same episode the character of Michael Jardine was promoted to Taggart's rank of detective chief inspector.

Family
The McManus family adopted Brian Connolly, later of 1970s glam rock band The Sweet; both men perceived a resemblance between them, and supposed McManus's father to have also been Connolly's.

Filmography

References

Sources
 No Matter What They Say - The Story of Sweet (HomeSweetHome Publishing, 2009).

External links
 
 Taggart Fan Club

1935 births
1994 deaths
Scottish people of Irish descent
Deaths from pneumonia in Scotland
People from Hamilton, South Lanarkshire
Scottish male television actors
20th-century Scottish male actors